Mussaenda philippica is a plant species in the family Rubiaceae that grows as a shrub or small tree. Native to the Philippines it is commonly grown elsewhere as an ornamental species.
Known varieties include: "Donna Laz" (pink), "Alicia Luz" (dark pink), "Queen Sirikit" (light pink), "Donna Aurora" (white), and "Donna Envangellina" (dark red).

References

External links
 

philippica
Flora of the Philippines
Plants described in 1834